The following lists events that happened during 1999 in Sudan.

Incumbents
President: Omar al-Bashir
Vice President:
 Ali Osman Taha (First)
 George Kongor Arop (Second)

Events

March
 March 1 - Sudan enters the Second Congo War.

References

 
Years of the 20th century in Sudan
1990s in Sudan
Sudan
Sudan